Harry Middleton may refer to:

 Harry J. Middleton (1921–2017), presidential speechwriter, journalist, writer, and library director
 Harry Middleton (nature writer) (1951–1993), southern American nature writer
 Harry Middleton (footballer, born 1937), English footballer
 Harry Middleton (footballer, born 1995), English footballer

See also
Henry Middleton (disambiguation)
 Harold Middleton, book series